Kick, Raoul, la moto, les jeunes et les autres is a 1980 French television series. It premiered on May 15, 1980 on TF1 and 6 episodes lasting 52 minutes each were broadcast. It was filmed in villages of the Ardèche including Alba-la-Romaine, Saint Pons, and Saint Jean Le Centenier. The series was directed by Marc Simenon and script written by Louis Rognoni and Daniel Goldenberg.

Cast 
 Frédéric de Pasquale : Raoul 
 Eric Do : Roger 
 Catherine Leprince : Christine
 Gérard Loussine : Lucien 
 Alain Desplanques : Jean-François 
 Louis-Michel Colla : Vincent
 Mehdi El Glaoui : Philippe 
 Frédéric Witta : Bernard 
 Charlotte Wallior : Anne 
 Mario D'Alba : Johny Speed 
 Évelyne Dandry : Martine 
 Mylène Demongeot : Martine #2 
 Paul Préboist : Jules 
 Maurice Chevit : Roulède
 Van Doude : Guilbeau 
 Michel Bardinet : Gravier 
 Philippe Moreau : Anglade 
 Jacques Verlier : Perrin 
 Paul Rieger : Chaille 
 Hong Maï Thomas : Mme Chaille 
 Pierre Bojic : Le médecin 
 Bernard Charlan : René

Episodes 
 Johnny Speed
 Le Moto Club
 Le Hold-up
 L’Enduro
 Le Champion
 Martine

External links
 

1980s French television series
1980 French television series debuts
1980 French television series endings
Films directed by Marc Simenon